This is a list of broadcast television stations that are licensed in the U.S. state of Rhode Island.

Full-power stations

Current full-power stations
VC refers to the station's PSIP virtual channel. RF refers to the station's physical RF channel.

Defunct full-power stations 
Channel 16: WNET (ABC/DuMont) Providence (3/23/1954-7/10/1955) (same license as WNAC-TV)

LPTV stations

See also 
 Free-to-air#North_America - Satellite

Rhode Island

Television stations